Nicola Mary Coughlan (born 9 January 1987) is an Irish actress. She is known for her roles as Clare Devlin in the Channel 4 sitcom Derry Girls (2018–2022) and Penelope Featherington in the Netflix period drama Bridgerton (2020–present).

Early life
Coughlan was born on 9 January 1987 in Galway, Ireland, and grew up in Oranmore. At the age of five, when watching her older sister performing in a school play, she decided to become an actress. She attended Scoil Mhuire for primary school and Calasanctius College for secondary school. She graduated with a degree in English and Classical Civilisation from the National University of Ireland, Galway. She then went on to train in England at the Oxford School of Drama and Birmingham School of Acting. She lives in London.

Career

Early work (2004–2017) 
At the age of 10, in 1997, Nicola Coughlan had an uncredited role in action thriller film My Brother's War. In 2004, she started her career with a role in Tom Collins’ short film, The Phantom Cnut, a revenge comedy. In the following years, she did various voice works in animated series. At some point, due to financial difficulties, Coughlan had to go back to Ireland. She was suffering from depression during this period and her family helped her through the entire process. She worked part-time at an optician in Galway. She responded to an open casting call for Jess and Joe Forever at The Old Vic in London and won the main role of Jess. The first performance was in September 2016 prior to a national tour.

Breakthrough (2018–present) 
In 2018, Coughlan began playing Clare Devlin, one of the main characters, in Derry Girls. This sitcom is set in Derry, Northern Ireland, in the 1990s. The series was broadcast in January and February 2018 on Channel 4. But it was after its rerelease onto streaming platform Netflix in December of the same year that the show gained an international audience and an instant popularity.

In the same year, she also played Hannah Dalton in Harlots. The period drama television series is set in 18th-century London. 2018 marked her West End debut in The Donmar Warehouse production of The Prime of Miss Jean Brodie. The Evening Standard named her "one of the Rising Stars of 2018". The same year, she competed against some of her Derry Girls co-stars in an episode of the show The Great British Bake Off.

In 2019, it was announced that Coughlan had been cast in the Netflix series Bridgerton, which premiered in December 2020. In this period-drama series based on the best-selling Julia Quinn book series of the same name, Coughlan plays Penelope Featherington, a reluctant debutante and youngest daughter of a nouveau-riche family in Regency-era London.

Charity and advocacy 
In 2018, while Coughlan was appearing on stage in The Prime of Miss Jean Brodie at London's Donmar Warehouse, she wrote a piece for the Guardian calling out unfair scrutiny of women's bodies in theatre criticism. In the following year, she made headlines again for rebutting the Daily Mirror’s comment on her 2019 British Academy Television Awards look: "Not the most flattering". She tweeted "I mean incorrect @DailyMirror I look smokin’, sorry bout it". In July 2020, she auctioned off an Alex Perry dress and raised €5,000 towards the Laura Lynn Hospice, an Irish children's hospice which provides specialist palliative and supportive care services.

In February 2019, 28 women with their suitcases led by Nicola Coughlan crossed London's Westminster Bridge to demand the decriminalisation of abortion in Northern Ireland. They represented the estimated number of women a week who had to travel to England to access abortion.

On 26 June 2020, Coughlan and her fellow Derry Girls co-stars performed a sketch with Saoirse Ronan for the RTÉ fundraising special RTÉ Does Comic Relief. The night's proceeds went to those affected by the COVID-19 pandemic.

Filmography

Film

Television

Recordings

Theatre

Awards and nominations

References

External links
 
 

Living people
1987 births
Actresses from Galway (city)
Alumni of Birmingham School of Acting
Alumni of the University of Galway
Alumni of the Oxford School of Drama
Irish stage actresses
Irish television actresses